Parliamentary elections were held in Kiribati on 24 July 1994, with a second round on 31 July. Although all 260 candidates for the 39 seats ran as independents, they could be divided into three groups; the National Progressive Party, Protect the Maneaba, and unaffiliated independents. Independents emerged as the largest group in Parliament, with 19 of the 39 seats.

Results

References

Kiribati
1994 in Kiribati
Elections in Kiribati
Election and referendum articles with incomplete results